KFIZ (1450 kHz, "News-Talk 1450") is a commercial AM radio station licensed to Fond du Lac, Wisconsin. The station is owned by Randy Hopper's Mountain Dog Media and the license is held by RBH Enterprises, Inc.  KFIZ airs a news/talk radio format.  The studios and offices are on Winnebago Drive and the transmitter site is off West Scott Street.  KFIZ currently broadcasts with 1,000 watts of power.

KFIZ is among Wisconsin's oldest commercial radio stations, beginning experimental broadcasts in 1922.

Programming
The station features local talk, farming and information shows on weekday mornings, followed by syndicated programs the rest of the day.  National hosts include Sean Hannity, Dave Ramsey, Mark Levin, Jim Bohannon and Coast to Coast AM with George Noory.  On weekdays, local news updates are heard every hour, with world and national news from Fox News Radio.  KFIZ is a member of the Wisconsin Radio Network for regional news and sports programming.

Sports programming on KFIZ includes local high school football, high school basketball, and college basketball, plus Major League Baseball as part of the Milwaukee Brewers Radio Network. KFIZ also airs NBA basketball as part of the Milwaukee Bucks Radio Network.

KFIZ used CNN Radio for its national news coverage in the 1990s. Around 2007, it switched its affiliation to Fox News Radio. Its on-air staff includes Pam Jahnke (Wisconsin Farm Report), Jerry St. John (The Early Show), and Jerry Schneider (The Jerry Schnieder Polka Show).

History

According to Federal Communications Commission (FCC) records, KFIZ's first license was granted in July 1923.  However, the station has traditionally traced its origin to earlier broadcasts by a possibly unlicensed station operated beginning in May 1922 by Fond du Lac businessman Oscar A. Huelsman, who operated a Dodge automobile dealership at 22 Forest Avenue. The station's studio was located on the third floor of the Haber Printing Company building at 18 Forest Avenue, next to Huelsman‘s auto showroom and garage. Edward "Cap" Conley was responsible for the technical side of the operation.

On July 6, 1923, a license for a new broadcasting station operating on 1100 kHz in Fond du Lac was issued jointly to the Daily Commonwealth newspaper and Oscar A. Huelsman. The station was randomly issued the call letters KFIZ from an alphabetical roster of available call signs, however, this was a rare exception to the standard practice of only stations west of the Mississippi River receiving call letters starting with "K", as stations east of this boundary normally received call letters starting with "W". No reason was given for this exception.

Ownership changed the next year to the Daily Commonwealth and Seifert Radio Corp., and the year after that was changed to the Daily Commonwealth and Wisconsin Radio Sales (Inc.), located at 22 Forest Avenue. In 1926 this was modified to just the Fond du Lac Commonwealth Reporter. On June 15, 1927, KFIZ was assigned to 1120 kHz, and on November 11, 1928, under the provisions of the Federal Radio Commission's General Order 40, the station moved to 1420 kHz, still at 100 watts. Ownership was changed again in 1929 to the Reporter Printing Company, and in 1931 the station moved to studios on the second floor of the Reporter Building at 18 West First Street.

In March 1941, with the implementation of the North American Regional Broadcasting Agreement, KFIZ moved to its current frequency of 1450 kHz, and in the mid-1940s the station increased transmitter power to 250 watts. The KFIZ Broadcasting Company acquired the station in May 1946 and owned the station through the early 1960s.

In November 1986, Wisconsin Cablevision & Radio Co., Inc. completed a merger by transferring the license for this station to Donald G. Jones and Wisconsin Cablevision Inc., a partnership doing business as the Wisconsin Cablevision Partnership. The deal was approved by the FCC on December 19, 1986, and the transaction was completed on December 28, 1986. In September 1987, the Cablevision Partnership made a deal to sell KFIZ to the Independence Broadcasting Wisconsin Corp. The deal was approved by the FCC on November 3, 1987, and the transaction was consummated on January 20, 1988.

In June 1993, Independence Broadcasting Wisconsin Corp. contracted to sell this station to Lakeside Cablevision Limited Partnership (doing business as Star Cablevision, a forerunner business to Charter Communications's Wisconsin operations). The deal was approved by the FCC on August 24, 1993, and the transaction was consummated on September 30, 1993.

In January 1997, Lakeside Broadcasting Wisconsin Limited Partnership reached an agreement to sell KFIZ to current owner RBH Enterprises, Inc., which does business as Mountain Dog Media and is operated by former State Senator Randy Hopper. The deal was approved by the FCC on January 23, 1997, and the transaction was consummated on the same day.

Randal B. Hopper’s RBH Enterprises informed the FCC on October 21 that new FM translator W264DN/100.7 (Fond du Lac) is operating pursuant to construction permit program test authority. W264DN was granted during the FCC’s AM Revitalization effort to relay KFIZ/1450. The FM frequency has not yet been mentioned on KFIZ’s website or Facebook page.

References

External links
KFIZ official website

FCC History Cards for KFIZ (covering 1927-1980)

News and talk radio stations in the United States
Sports radio stations in the United States
Fond du Lac County, Wisconsin
Radio stations established in 1923
1923 establishments in Wisconsin